John Lewis Pacella (born September 15, 1956) is an American former Major League Baseball pitcher. He became known for his unusual delivery that sometimes caused him to lose his cap after a pitch.

Background
After going 21-4 in three seasons at Connetquot High School in Bohemia, he was drafted by the New York Mets in the fourth round of the 1974 Major League Baseball Draft.

Major League career
He made his major league debut out of the bullpen on his 21st birthday against the Philadelphia Phillies. After retiring the side in the seventh inning, Pacella walked the first batter of the eighth, Ted Sizemore. A botched pick off attempt allowed Sizemore to move to second, from where he stole third. An error by Mets shortstop Doug Flynn allowed Ron Reed to reach first. Larry Bowa then drove Sizemore in with a single, while Reed advanced to third and later scored on wild pitch by Pacella, who escaped without allowing an earned run. He made two more appearances that season, each time pitching one perfect inning.

After pitching well in his first two appearances, he failed to make it out of the first inning in his third. For the season, he went 0-2 with a 4.41 ERA in four games.

After starting the season in the bullpen, he was moved into the starting rotation in June. He earned his first major league win against Steve Carlton and the Phillies on June 27, and improved to 3-0 with a 3.43 ERA on July 17 when he and Jeff Reardon combined to shut the Atlanta Braves out. Unfortunately, things went south from there as Pacella lost his next four decisions and finished the season at 3-4 with a 5.14 ERA. After the season, he and infielder José Moreno were traded to the San Diego Padres for  Cy Young Award winner Randy Jones. The following spring, the Padres dealt Pacella and Jerry Mumphrey to the New York Yankees for Ruppert Jones, Joe Lefebvre, Tim Lollar and Chris Welsh.

After spending the  season in Triple A, Pacella won a job in the Yankees' bullpen out of spring training . He made three appearances, getting hit hard in each, before being reassigned to Triple A Columbus. Shortly after his arrival in Columbus, he was dealt along with Larry Milbourne and Pete Filson from the Yankees to the Minnesota Twins for Butch Wynegar and Roger Erickson on May 12, 1982.

He reported directly to the Twins, and remained with the club for the rest of the season despite a high 7.32 ERA. On November 1, he was traded to the Texas Rangers for Len Whitehouse. He failed to make the club out of spring training, and was released just as the  season was set to begin.

During the season, he signed a minor league deal with the Baltimore Orioles. He earned a September call-up to the big league club in September , but was released at the end of the season. Shortly afterwards, he signed with the Detroit Tigers. He appeared briefly with the Tigers in the middle of the  season. During the  season, his contract was sold to the Yokohama Bay Stars of the Japanese Central League.

Post-playing career
Today, Pacella is a pitching instructor at Big League Baseball School in Ohio.

References

External links

John Pacella at Ultimate Mets Database

1956 births
Living people
Major League Baseball pitchers
Baseball players from New York (state)
New York Mets players
New York Yankees players
Minnesota Twins players
Baltimore Orioles players
Detroit Tigers players
Sportspeople from Brooklyn
Baseball players from New York City
Nashville Sounds players
Marion Mets players
Tidewater Tides players
Lynchburg Mets players
Columbus Clippers players
Jackson Mets players
Charlotte O's players
Wausau Mets players
Rochester Red Wings players
Toledo Mud Hens players
Denver Zephyrs players